Oedipus at Colonus, Op. 93 is incidental music by Felix Mendelssohn to Sophocles' play Oedipus at Colonus (401 BC) consisting of an orchestral introduction and nine scenes for two choirs and soloists. The work was commissioned by Frederick William IV of Prussia and in 1845 had its first performance in Potsdam at the Neues Palais. William's goal was to encourage the revival of Greek tragedy and classical works among Berlin audiences. Nine days later, on 10 November 1845 the work received its first public performance. The work takes about 50 to 60 minutes to play.

During its time, the work was very successful and received many performance within Germany and abroad. It is also regarded as one of Mendelssohn's most popular works.

Scoring 
The work is written for two voices, a double male chorus, and orchestra of fifteen instruments:

 flute
 oboe
 clarinet
 bassoon
 cornet
 trombone
 timpani
 violin
 viola
 contrabass

Recordings 
 1993: René Pape (bass), actors , Franziska Pigulla, Otto Sander, Gunter Schoß, ; Berlin Radio Symphony Orchestra, Berlin Radio Choir, Carl Maria von Weber Men's Choir, Stefan Soltész; Capriccio 10393

References

Further reading
 

Compositions by Felix Mendelssohn
Incidental music
1845 compositions
Adaptations of works by Sophocles